Al Yazmalım is a Turkish television series based on the novel My Poplar in a Red Scarf by Chinghiz Aitmatov and 1978 Turkish romantic drama film The Girl with the Red Scarf. It is broadcast on ATV.

Cast

References 

Turkish drama television series
2011 Turkish television series debuts
2012 Turkish television series endings
Television series by Ay Yapım
ATV (Turkey) original programming
Television shows set in Istanbul
Television series produced in Istanbul
Television series set in the 2010s